Gajahmada Mojosari Stadium is a multi-use stadium in Mojosari, Mojokerto Regency, Indonesia.  It is currently used mostly for football matches and is used as the home stadium for Persegi Mojokerto.  The stadium has a capacity of 10,000 people.

References

mojokerto Regency
Sports venues in Indonesia
Football venues in Indonesia
Buildings and structures in East Java